Davis v. Commonwealth of Massachusetts, 167 U.S. 43 (1897), was a case in which the Supreme Court of the United States sustained a conviction of a man for making a speech on Boston Common in violation of an ordinance that forbade the making of a public address there without a permit from the mayor.

Facts of the case 
Section 66 of the Revised Ordinances of the City of Boston (1893) reads as follows: 
'Sec. 66. No person shall, in or upon any of the public grounds, make any public address, discharge any cannon or firearm, expose for sale any goods, wares or merchandise, erect or maintain any booth, stand, tent or apparatus for the purposes of public amusement or show, except in accordance with a permit from the mayor.'

It was alleged by the prosecution that Davis made a speech on Boston Common without a permit.  Davis was brought before the Municipal Court of the City of Boston and convicted of violating section 66.

Prior history 
The proceedings were removed to the Superior Court of the county of Suffolk, where Davis renewed a motion which he had interposed in the municipal court to quash the complaint. There were seven reasons argued to support the motion; among these was the assertion that the ordinance violated the rights alleged to be secured to the accused by the constitution of the state, and by the Fourteenth Amendment. The motion to quash being overruled by the Superior Court, Davis was tried before the court and a jury.

At the trial the government put in evidence the ordinance heretofore referred to, and called the attention of the court to sections 35 and 39 of chapter 448 of the acts passed by the legislature of Massachusetts in the year 1854.  Davis was convicted and subsequently appealed to the Supreme Court.

Decision 
Davis' conviction was upheld by a unanimous decision of the Supreme Court..

References

External links
 

1897 in United States case law
United States Supreme Court cases
United States Supreme Court cases of the Fuller Court
United States Free Speech Clause case law
Legal history of Massachusetts
Boston Common